Namhae Chemical Corporation is a large South Korean company which produces fertilizers and chemicals. The company, established in 1974, is headquartered in Yeosu, Jeollanam-do, and operates a branch office in Jung-gu, Seoul.

Notes

See also
List of South Korean companies
Economy of South Korea

External links 
 company website (in Korean)
 company snapshot
 ilo.org employment report

South Jeolla Province
Chemical companies of South Korea
Companies listed on the Korea Exchange